Francis McDonnell (24 January 1863 – 26 November 1928) was a draper, and member of both the Queensland Legislative Council and the Queensland Legislative Assembly.

Early years
McDonnell was born at Ennis, County Clare, Ireland, in 1863 to James McDonnell, a farmer, and his wife Elizabeth (née Bradish) and attended Ennis Christian Brothers School. At aged thirteen, he worked in a factory before returning to school and then in 1879 he was working for Gallagher Bros as an apprentice draper. By coincidence, a fellow employee was T.C. Beirne, who also went on to make a name for himself as a draper in Brisbane.

Working career
Accompanied by his only sister, McDonnell arrived in Brisbane in 1886 and began work as a drapery assistant with Finney, Isles & Co., T. J. Geoghegan, and, from 1889 till 1896, Edwards & Lamb. In 1901, in partnership with Hubert East and the financial backing of Peter Murphy, they established McDonnell & East, Drapers.

Political life
In 1888, McDonnell helped organise the Shop Assistants' Early Closing Association and its associated publication, the Early Closing Advocate with articles by William Lane. As a Labour candidate, he contested the seat of Fortitude Valley at the 1893 colonial election, losing to the Ministerialists, John Watson and John McMaster.

McDonnell stood again for the seat of Fortitude Valley at the 1896 election, this time polling enough votes to finish second to John McMaster in the two-member electorate, and therefore winning a seat. He remained a member of the Legislative Assembly for the next eleven years, declining to stand at the 1907 election.

Within three months of his retirement from the Assembly in 1907, McDonnell was appointed by the Kidston ministry to the Queensland Legislative Council. He remained a member until 1922 when the Council was abolished.

Personal life
McDonnell married Mary Heffernan in 1890 and together they had seven children. He died in 1928, and his funeral was held at St Stephen's Cathedral and proceeded to the Toowong Cemetery for his burial.

References

Members of the Queensland Legislative Assembly
Members of the Queensland Legislative Council
1863 births
1928 deaths
Burials at Toowong Cemetery
Australian Labor Party members of the Parliament of Queensland